Micaela Alvarez (born June 8, 1958) is a United States district judge of the United States District Court for the Southern District of Texas.

Education and career

Born in Donna, Texas, Alvarez received her Bachelor of Science degree from the University of Texas in 1980 and her Juris Doctor from the University of Texas School of Law in 1989. She was in private practice in McAllen, Texas, from 1989–1995, and from 1997 to 2004. She was a presiding judge of the 139th Judicial District Court, Texas from 1995 to 1996.

Federal judicial service

On June 16, 2004, Alvarez was nominated by President George W. Bush to a seat on the United States District Court for the Southern District of Texas vacated by David Hittner. She was confirmed by the United States Senate on November 20, 2004, and received her commission on December 13, 2004.

Other service

Alvarez also served on the President's Advisory Commission on Educational Excellence for Hispanic Americans.

See also
List of Hispanic/Latino American jurists
List of first women lawyers and judges in Texas

References

Sources

1958 births
Living people
Texas state court judges
Hispanic and Latino American judges
University of Texas School of Law alumni
Judges of the United States District Court for the Southern District of Texas
United States district court judges appointed by George W. Bush
21st-century American judges
People from Donna, Texas
21st-century American women judges